A number of ships were named Delalba, including:

, an American cargo ship which ran aground in 1937
, an American Type C2-F ship

Ship names